Sheboygan Area School District is a public school district in Sheboygan, Wisconsin that serves that city, the village of Cleveland, and the towns of Centerville, Mosel, Sheboygan and Wilson. It has about 1,187 teachers and other employees and about 10,232 students. Mr. Seth Harvatine is the superintendent.

The district comprises one early childhood school, 12 elementary schools, three middle schools, and two high schools. In addition, it operates several alternative programs, including Riverview Alternative Program for students at risk of dropping out, STRIVE Alternative Program (Sheboygan Transition through Reintegration and Involvement in Vocational and Education) for severely emotionally disturbed students, W.A.V.E. Alternative Program (Alternative Work, Academic and Vocational Education), Teen-Age Parent Program (TAPP) and Teenship I and II.  Many of these programs are housed at the former Central High School building, which also serves as the home of the central district offices.

The high schools host their graduation ceremony in a combined fashion in the second week of June in Vollrath Park's natural bowl amphitheater, with North graduates sitting at the north end and South's graduates filling the south portion of the bowl. In the event of inclement weather, the ceremonies are held individually at the school's respective field houses.

The district's main offices moved from its Central Services facility (the former Central High School) in downtown in the fall of 2021, to an office facility south of the city which was formerly the headquarters of Wilson Mutual Insurance, facilities made redundant after a merger with Encova Insurance. The move of the district's central services will allow expansion of the programs already in the Central building.

Early childhood schools
 Early Learning Center

Elementary schools
 Cleveland (in the village of Cleveland, serves the residents of that village and the towns of Mosel and Centerville in Manitowoc County)
 Cooper
 Grant
 Jackson
 Jefferson
 Lake Country Academy
 Longfellow
 Lincoln-Erdman
 James Madison
 Pigeon River & Étude Elementary (shared building)
 Sheboygan Leadership Academy
 Sheridan
 Wilson

Middle schools
 Étude Middle School
 Farnsworth Middle School
 Lake Country Academy
 Horace Mann Middle School
 Urban Middle School
 George D. Warriner Middle School

High schools
 Central High School 
 Étude High School
 George D. Warriner High School
 Sheboygan North High School 
 Sheboygan South High School

Alternative programs
 Jailbound Instruction
 Adolescent Treatment Program (ATP)
 Homebound and Hospitalbound Instruction

See also
 WSHS (FM), the high school radio for North High School
 Third Ward School, living school museum
 List of school districts in Wisconsin

References

External links
 Sheboygan Area School District

School districts in Wisconsin
Education in Sheboygan, Wisconsin